Dobson Collins (born July 12, 1987) is a former American football wide receiver. He was originally signed by the San Francisco 49ers as an undrafted free agent in 2009. He played college football at Gardner–Webb.

Collins has also been a member of the Philadelphia Eagles, BC Lions, Edmonton Eskimos, Hamilton Tiger-Cats, Ottawa Redblacks and Baltimore Ravens.

Early years
Collins was born in Miami, Florida and later moved to Stone Mountain, Georgia, where he attended Stone Mountain High School. He played high school football there and, in his senior year, recorded 21 receptions for 332 yards and two touchdowns.

College career
Collins played college football and participated in track and field at Gardner–Webb University. During his football career, he played in 42 games with 22 starts, caught 143 passes for 1,754 yards and 14 touchdowns as a wide receiver. He was a two-time All-Big South selection as a punt returner and wide receiver. In his freshman season, he caught eight passes for 55 yards. As a sophomore, he made eight receptions for 104 yards. In his junior year, he caught 51 passes for 649 yards and three touchdowns. As a senior, he made 76 receptions for 937 yards and 10 touchdowns. He was ranked as one of the top punt returners in the conference with a 9.7 yards per punt return average. In track and field, he holds the school record in the 55, 60 and 110 meter hurdles. He was named the 2006 Atlantic Sun Conference champion in the 60 meter hurdles and was named the Freshman of the Year after his team won the outdoor track title that year.

Professional career

San Francisco 49ers
Collins was signed by the San Francisco 49ers as an undrafted free agent following the 2009 NFL Draft. He was waived on September 5, 2009 during final roster cuts. He subsequently re-signed to the team's practice squad on September 6. He was released from the practice squad on October 5.

Philadelphia Eagles
Collins was signed to the Philadelphia Eagles practice squad on October 22, 2009. He was re-signed to a three-year contract on January 11, 2010. He was waived on September 3.

BC Lions
Collins signed with the BC Lions on April 27, 2011. He was later released on August 8, 2011.

Edmonton Eskimos
On August 15, 2011, Collins was signed by the Edmonton Eskimos after their receiving corps had been depleted by injuries.  He was released on June 23, 2012.

Hamilton Tiger-Cats
On July 29, 2013, Collins signed with the Hamilton Tiger-Cats.

Ottawa Redblacks
On January 31, 2014, Collins signed with the expansion Ottawa Redblacks. He scored the first ever touchdown at TD Place Stadium in Redblacks history after he recovered an onside punt.

Montreal Alouettes
On February 20, 2015, Collins signed a one-year contract with the Montreal Alouettes. He played in one game against the Calgary Stampeders where he had three catches for 51 yards, but he had a costly fumble at the Calgary 2-yard line that ended an Alouette drive. He was subsequently released on August 10, 2015.

Baltimore Ravens
On October 25, 2016, Collins was signed to the Ravens' practice squad. He was released from the Ravens' practice squad on November 7, 2016.

Personal life
Collins majored in biology at Gardner–Webb University.

References

External links
Montreal Alouettes bio
Ottawa RedBlacks bio
Hamilton Tiger-Cats bio

1987 births
Living people
African-American players of American football
BC Lions players
Edmonton Elks players
Hamilton Tiger-Cats players
People from Stone Mountain, Georgia
Philadelphia Eagles players
Players of American football from Georgia (U.S. state)
San Francisco 49ers players
Sportspeople from DeKalb County, Georgia
Gardner–Webb Runnin' Bulldogs football players
Ottawa Redblacks players
Montreal Alouettes players
Baltimore Ravens players
21st-century African-American sportspeople
20th-century African-American people